SOTU is an initialism that may represent:

Places
 Sotu, Les Regueres, Asturias, Spain; a parish

Government 
 State of the Union, annual address by the President of the United States before Congress
 Special Operations Task Unit
 of the Estonian Special Operations Force
 of the Portuguese Special Operations Troops Centre

Music 
 Sound of the Underground, a 2003 album by Girls Aloud
 Sounds of the Universe, a 2009 album by Depeche Mode
 SOTU, 2013 album by Sunnery James & Ryan Marciano

Other uses
 State of the Union (TV program), a Sunday morning talk show on CNN

See also

 
 
 STU (disambiguation)
 SOU (disambiguation)
 SU (disambiguation)